Lemuel James Alston (1760–1836) was a slave owner and U.S. Representative from South Carolina.

Born in the eastern part of Granville County (which is now Warren County) in the Province of North Carolina, Alston moved to South Carolina after the Revolutionary War and settled near Greens Mill, which soon became the town of Greenville, South Carolina. He studied law and was admitted to the bar and commenced practice in Greenville. He served as member of the South Carolina House of Representatives from 1789 to 1790.

Alston was elected as a Democratic-Republican to the Tenth and Eleventh Congresses (March 4, 1807 – March 3, 1811). He moved in 1816 to Clarke County, Alabama, and settled near Grove Hill, Alabama where he presided over the orphans' court and the county court from November 1816 until May 1821. He died at "Alston Place," Clarke County, Alabama, in 1836.

References

Sources

1760 births
1836 deaths
People from Warren County, North Carolina
People from Clarke County, Alabama
Democratic-Republican Party members of the United States House of Representatives from South Carolina